The CZW Medal of Valor Championship was a championship contested at the Combat Zone Wrestling (CZW) training dojo.

Being a professional wrestling championship, it was not won via direct competition; it was instead won via a predetermined ending to a match. Each Medal of Valor match was a 2 out of 3 falls contest, until this stipulation was suspended by Mike Del upon him becoming champion. There were thirteen reigns by eleven different wrestlers.

Title history

Combined reigns

References

External links

CZWrestling.com

Television wrestling championships
Hardcore wrestling championships